Brandon Manzonelli (born December 23, 1989, in St. Louis, Missouri) is an American soccer player.

Club career
Manzonelli signed with Spanish club Villarreal CF in 2006 at the age of 16, and played 25 games with the club's U-18 team, recording eight goals and 10 assists, as well as playing three games with Villarreal's reserves.

After trialling with Manchester City and Blackburn Rovers of the Premier League, Manzonelli signed with the New England Revolution in early 2008. He made his full professional debut for the Revolution on July 1, 2008, as a second-half substitute in a U.S. Open Cup third-round game against Richmond Kickers.

After his release by New England, Manzonelli trialled with numerous clubs in Europe, including teams from Italy, Spain, Germany, Denmark, Scotland and England. However, he failed to earn a contract due to Citizenship issues. Manzonelli finally returned to soccer when he signed for NASL club Atlanta Silverbacks on March 21, 2013.

International career
He was called in by Thomas Rongen for the United States under-20 team for a friendly against Mexico on July 11, 2008, and recorded two assists in the 3–0 victory. Manzonelli played in the Milk Cup in Northern Ireland last July/August with the u-20 USA against Belgium, Northern Ireland, and Wales and got an assist against Wales.

References

External links

1989 births
Living people
American soccer players
New England Revolution players
Atlanta Silverbacks players
Springfield Demize players
Association football midfielders
Soccer players from Missouri
USL League Two players
United States men's under-20 international soccer players
Major Indoor Soccer League (2008–2014) players
St. Louis Ambush (2013–) players